In October 1983, the Riverside Shakespeare Company, then New York City's only year-round professional Shakespeare theatre company, inaugurated The Shakespeare Project, based at the theatre company's home on the Upper West Side of Manhattan, The Shakespeare Center.  The Shakespeare Project was the first major New York residency of actors from the Royal Shakespeare Company - with Edwin Richfield, Heather Canning, Christopher Ravenscroft, Jennie Stoller and John Kane (the later two from Peter Brook's A Midsummer Night's Dream) - for a week of public workshops, panel discussions, seminars and performances at the company's Upper West Side theatre, The Shakespeare Center. The event was launched at a luncheon in the Shakespeare Room of the Algonquin Hotel attended by Joseph Papp, Helen Hayes, Frank Rich, Gloria Skurski, W. Stuart McDowell, and members of the Royal Shakespeare Company in mid October 1983.  According to the New York Times, over one thousand actors, students, teachers and stage directors, from the ages of 15 to 87, signed up for 22 sessions taught by some of the leading actors from London's Royal Shakespeare Company.

At the launching of The Shakespeare Project, Marilyn Stasio of The New York Post, called it "the adventurous Shakespeare Project involving the five guests from the Royal Shakespeare Company...a unique venture."  Stasio added, "Everybody at the opening night party, including such members of the theatrical community as Milo O'Shea, Barnard Hughes and Gloria Foster, seemed to want to a regular event of the unprecedented project."  In the evenings, the five actor also performed a "five-hander" version of Shakespeare The Merchant of Venice, Dylan Thomas' Under Milk Wood, and the New York premiere of D. H. Lawrence's The Tarnished Phoenix.

The week-long residency drew sell-out crowds at its two venues, the All Angels Episcopal Church at Lincoln Center, and The Shakespeare Center - the home of the Riverside Shakespeare Company, located in West Park Presbyterian Church at Amsterdam Avenue and West 86th Street in Manhattan.  The Host Committee for The Shakespeare Project included Henry Guettel, Leonard Bernstein, Helen Hayes, Bernard Jacobs, John V. Lindsay, Joseph Papp and George Plimpton.

The first residency of its kind by actors from the Royal Shakespeare Company 

According to The New York Times, until the launching of The Shakespeare Project in 1983, "the Royal Shakespeare Company's actors had never conducted their workshops in New York City and never been open to actors in addition to students."

On the opening night of The Shakespeare Project, Christopher Ravenscroft of the Royal Shakespeare Company's production of Nicholas Nickleby was quoted by Marilyn Stasio of The New York Post, observing:

To this, John Kane, who created the role of Puck in Peter Brook's seminal production of A Midsummer Night's Dream, added:

Edwin Richfield, whose roles at the Royal Shakespeare Company included Friar Lawrence in Romeo and Juliet said:

Heather Canning, who appeared in the Royal Shakespeare Company production of Marat/Sade on Broadway, noted:

About The Shakespeare Project, Joseph Papp, head of the New York Shakespeare Festival said, "The Shakespeare Project provides a unique opportunity for New Yorkers to have exposure to actors from one of the leading Shakespeare ensembles, The Royal Shakespeare Company."  On the promotional material for the project, Helen Hayes wrote: "On October 18–22, the Riverside Shakespeare Company will host The Shakespeare Project, when five actors from London's Royal Shakespeare Company will present workshops, seminars, and performances in an entertaining and educational program offered for the first time in this city.  Join me there, October 18th!"

As Samuel G. Freedman wrote in The New York Times on October 24, 1983:

The Shakespeare Project was part of an educational program presented by The Riverside Shakespeare Company and the Alliance for Creative Theatre and Educational Research (ACTER) at the University of California at Santa Barbara.  It was hosted by the Riverside School for Shakespeare, the year-round professional training program designed for actors, directors and teachers, under the direction of John Clingerman, working with actors and directors from The Riverside Shakespeare Company.  The Shakespeare Project was conceived and produced by W. Stuart McDowell, Artistic Director, and Gloria Skurski, Executive Director of the Riverside Shakespeare Company.

References 

Shakespeare festivals in the United States
Shakespearean theatre companies
Performing arts education in New York City